Schizophrenia is a mental disorder characterized by abnormal behavior and misinterpretation of reality.

Schizophrenia or Schizophrenic may also refer to:

Music
 Schizophrenia (Sepultura album), 1987
 Schizophrenia (Wayne Shorter album), 1967
 Schizophrenic (JC Chasez album), 2004
 Schizophrenic, an album by Wayne Wonder, 2001
 "Schizophrenia", a song by Sonic Youth from Sister, 1987
 "Schizophrenia", a song by XXXTentacion from ?, 2018
 "Schizophrenic", a song by Mumzy Stranger from Journey Begins, 2010

Other uses
 Schizophrenia (film), a 1997 Russian crime film
 Schizophrenia (object-oriented programming), a complication of delegation in object-oriented programming

See also
 Schizophreniac: The Whore Mangler, a 1997 American exploitation film
 Schizo (disambiguation)
 Cultural jet lag